Collaboration is a studio album by Australian musician Tommy Emmanuel and other Australian artists. The album was released in October 1998 and peaked at number 51 on the ARIA charts. "After The Love Has Gone" was released as single and peaked at number 74 on the ARIA Charts.

Track listing

Charts

References

1998 albums
Tommy Emmanuel albums
Sony Music Australia albums
Collaborative albums